Medivnyk or medovyk іs a Ukrainian honey cake.

According to food writer Marianna Dushar, medivnyk is a fundamental dessert of Lviv regional cuisine. Polish-Ukrainian food writer Viktoria Popin classifies medivnyk a keks (a type of fruitcake). Medivnyk typically includes spices, nuts and raisins. Buckwheat honey is preferred to give the cake its distinctive taste.

Apart from the spongy cake, medivnyk in Ukrainian can also mean prianyk, a hard honey cookie.

See also 
 Miodownik
 Medovik

References 

Ukrainian cakes
Honey cakes